Nils Johan Schjander (1859–1903) was a Norwegian engineer and a member of the movement known as the Kristiania Bohemians. He is known for having taken part in a journey to Patagonia and writing a diary, published as En reise til Patagonia (A Journey to Patagonia). For the Kristiania Bohemians, Patagonia was a promised land where several dreamed of creating a free state. Schjander was involved in surveying and mapping Patagonia on behalf of the Argentine Southern Land Company between 1889 and 1891.

References

1859 births
1903 deaths
Norwegian engineers
Norwegian expatriates in Argentina
Surveyors